Clousta is a hamlet on Mainaland, in the island's west, Shetland, Scotland. Approximately seventy people live here, many of whom are commuters, but local industries include mussel farming, and crofting. Clousta is in the parish of Sandsting.

References

External links

Canmore - Clousta House site record

Villages in Mainland, Shetland